Sergei Gukov (born 1977) is a professor of mathematics and theoretical physicist. Gukov graduated from Moscow Institute of Physics and Technology (MIPT) in Moscow, Russia before obtaining a doctorate in physics from Princeton University under the supervision of Edward Witten.

He held a Long-term Prize fellowship of Clay Mathematics Institute at Harvard University (2001-2006) and during 2007-2008 was a member of the school of mathematics at the Institute for Advanced Study, Princeton. Since 2007, he has been professor of mathematics and theoretical physics at the California Institute of Technology (Caltech). Starting 2010, Gukov was elected as an external scientific member of the Max Planck Society at the MPIM, Bonn.

Sergei Gukov is a member of the Scientific Board of the American Institute of Mathematics (AIM) and a member of the International Advisory Board of the Centre for Quantum Mathematics (QM). He has served on numerous other scientific committees and advisory boards. He is editor of the journal Communications in Mathematical Physics, Journal of Knot Theory and Its Ramifications, and Letters in Mathematical Physics.

In 2010, along with Alain Connes, Gukov was invited to deliver the 8th Takagi Lectures, the only named lecture series of the Mathematical Society of Japan. In 2019, Gukov was invited to give the Whittemore Lectures at Yale University.

Known for Gukov-Vafa-Witten superpotential, Gukov-Witten surface operators, and Gukov-Pei-Putrov-Vafa (GPPV) invariants. In recent years, he teamed up with Boris Feigin, Hiraku Nakajima and other mathematicians to explore hidden algebraic structures in topology and in quantum field theory.

References

External links
 Faculty page at Caltech
 Clay Mathematics Institute
 Interview at MIPT (in Russian)

1977 births
Living people
California Institute of Technology faculty
Scientists from Moscow
Princeton University alumni
Russian physicists
American string theorists
University of California, Santa Barbara faculty
Moscow Institute of Physics and Technology alumni